Bol Baby Bol is a Hindi musical game show produced by Fox Television Studios that aired on STAR One Friday and Saturday nights. It is based on the American show Don't Forget the Lyrics!. Hosted by Adnan Sami, the show featured contestants who were quizzed on the lyrics of popular Bollywood songs. Contestants that provide correct answers can win as much as Rs 25 lakh, equivalent to about US $64,000.

Prizes

References

External links
Official Site

Don't Forget the Lyrics!
Indian reality television series
Star One (Indian TV channel) original programming
Indian game shows
2007 Indian television series debuts
2008 Indian television series endings
Television series by 20th Century Fox Television
Indian television series based on American television series
Musical game shows
Hindi-language television shows